Pelthydrus is a genus of beetles belonging to the family Hydrophilidae. The genus has primarily Oriental origin and consists with 65 described species.

Species
 Pelthydrus acutus Schönmann, 1994
 Pelthydrus angulatus Bian, Schönmann & L.Ji, 2008
 Pelthydrus balinensis Schönmann, 1994
 Pelthydrus boholensis Schönmann, 1994
 Pelthydrus borneensis Schönmann, 1994
 Pelthydrus boukali Schönmann, 1995
 Pelthydrus brouni Orchymont, 1919
 Pelthydrus championi Orchymont, 1926
 Pelthydrus corporaali Orchymont, 1923
 Pelthydrus dudgeoni Schönmann, 1994
 Pelthydrus elongatulus Schönmann, 1995
 Pelthydrus excisus Schönmann, 1994
 Pelthydrus fenestratus Schönmann, 1995
 Pelthydrus feuerborni Orchymont, 1932
 Pelthydrus globosus Schönmann, 1994
 Pelthydrus grossus Bian, Dongju, Schönmann & Lanzhu Ji, 2009
 Pelthydrus hendrichi Schönmann, 1995
 Pelthydrus horaki Schönmann, 1994
 Pelthydrus hortensis Schönmann, 1995
 Pelthydrus inaspectus Orchymont, 1926
 Pelthydrus incognitus Schönmann, 1995
 Pelthydrus indicus Schönmann, 1995
 Pelthydrus iniquus Schönmann, 1995
 Pelthydrus insularis Schönmann, 1995
 Pelthydrus jaechi Schönmann, 1994
 Pelthydrus jaechorum Schönmann, 1995
 Pelthydrus japonicus Satô, 1960
 Pelthydrus jendeki Schönmann, 1994
 Pelthydrus jengi Schönmann, 1995
 Pelthydrus kapitensis Schönmann, 1995
 Pelthydrus kelabitensis Schönmann, 1994
 Pelthydrus kodadai Schönmann, 1994
 Pelthydrus longifolius Bian, Dongju, Schönmann & Lanzhu Ji, 2009
 Pelthydrus madli Schönmann, 1995
 Pelthydrus microreticulatus Schönmann, 1995
 Pelthydrus minutus Orchymont, 1919
 Pelthydrus natifer Schönmann, 1995
 Pelthydrus nepalensis Schönmann, 1995
 Pelthydrus okinawanus Nakane, 1982
 Pelthydrus ovalis Orchymont, 1932
 Pelthydrus philippinensis Schönmann, 1995
 Pelthydrus posterioinsectus Schönmann, 1994
 Pelthydrus rosa Bian, Dongju, Schönmann & Lanzhu Ji, 2009
 Pelthydrus rugosiceps Schönmann, 1995
 Pelthydrus ruiliensis Zhu, Bingyue, Lanzhu Ji & Dongju Bian, 2018
 Pelthydrus sarawacensis Schönmann, 1995
 Pelthydrus schillhammeri Schönmann, 1995
 Pelthydrus schoedli Schönmann, 1994
 Pelthydrus schoenmanni Zhu, Ji & Bian, 2019
 Pelthydrus sculpturatus Orchymont, 1919
 Pelthydrus siamensis Schönmann, 1995
 Pelthydrus similis Orchymont, 1937
 Pelthydrus speculifer Schönmann, 1995
 Pelthydrus subgrossus Bian, Dongju, Schönmann & Lanzhu Ji, 2009
 Pelthydrus suffarcinatus Schönmann, 1995
 Pelthydrus thienemanni Orchymont, 1932
 Pelthydrus tongi Bian, Schönmann & L.Ji, 2008
 Pelthydrus truncatus Orchymont, 1932
 Pelthydrus venatorcapitis Schönmann, 1994
 Pelthydrus ventricarinatus Schönmann, 1995
 Pelthydrus vietnamensis Schönmann, 1994
 Pelthydrus vitalisi Orchymont, 1926
 Pelthydrus waltraudae Bian, Schönmann & L.Ji, 2008
 Pelthydrus yulinensis Bian, Dongju, Schönmann & Lanzhu Ji, 2009
 Pelthydrus zetteli Schönmann, 1995

References

Hydrophilidae